Chadian Arabic, also known as Shuwa Arabic, Baggara Arabic, Western Sudanic Arabic, or West Sudanic Arabic (WSA), is a variety of Arabic and the first language of 1.6 million people, both town dwellers and nomadic cattle herders. The majority of its speakers live in southern Chad. Its range is an east-to-west oval in the Sahel. Nearly all of this territory is within Chad or Sudan. It is also spoken elsewhere in the vicinity of Lake Chad in the countries of Cameroon, Nigeria, Niger. Finally, it is spoken in slivers of the Central African Republic, and South Sudan. In addition, this language serves as a lingua franca in much of the region. In most of its range, it is one of several local languages and often not among the major ones.

Naming and classification
This language does not have a native name shared by all its speakers, beyond "Arabic". It arose as the native language of nomadic cattle herders (baggāra, Standard Arabic baqqāra , means 'cattlemen', from baqar).

In 1913, a French colonial administrator in Chad, Henri Carbou, wrote a grammar of the local dialect of the Ouaddaï highlands, a region of eastern Chad on the border with Sudan. In 1920, a British colonial administrator in Nigeria, Gordon James Lethem, wrote a grammar of the Borno dialect, in which he noted that the same language was spoken in Kanem (in western Chad) and Ouaddaï (in eastern Chad). Since its publication, this language has become widely cited academically as "Shuwa Arabic"; however, the term "Shuwa" was in use only among non-Arab people in Borno State, Nigeria. Around 2000, the term "Western Sudanic Arabic" was proposed by a specialist in the language, Jonathan Owens. The geographical sense of "Sudanic" invoked by Owens is not the modern country of Sudan, but the Sahel in general, a region dubbed bilad al-sudan, 'the land of the blacks', by Arabs as far back as the medieval era. In the era of British colonialism in Africa, colonial administrators too used "the Sudan" to mean the entire Sahel.

Based on population movements and shared genealogical histories, Sudanic and Egyptian varieties of Arabic have traditionally been classified into a larger Egypto-Sudanic grouping. However, alternative analysis of linguistic features supports the general independence of Sudanic Arabic varieties from Egyptian Arabic.

Distribution and varieties

Dialects 
Two clear subdialects of Western Sudanic Arabic are discernable:

 Bagirmi Arabic - spoken from eastern Nigeria to Chad in the southern fringe of the area. Characterized by syllable final stress in forms such as katáb “he wrote”
 Urban varieties of Chad - spoken in Ndjamena and Abbeche, and characterized by simplification tendencies.

Speakers by country

Chad 
The majority of speakers live in southern Chad between 10 and 14 degrees north latitude. In Chad, it is the local language of the national capital, N'Djamena, and its range encompasses such other major cities as Abéché, Am Timan, and Mao. It is the native language of 12% of Chadians. Chadian Arabic's associated lingua franca is widely spoken in Chad, so that Chadian Arabic and its lingua franca combined are spoken by somewhere between 40% and 60% of the Chadian population.

Sudan 
In Sudan, it is spoken in the southwest, in southern Kordofan and southern Darfur, but excluding the cities of al-Ubayyid and al-Fashir.

Nigeria 
In Nigeria, it spoken by 10% of the population of Maiduguri, the capital of Borno, and by at least 100,000 villagers elsewhere in Borno.

Other 

Its range in other African countries includes a sliver of the Central African Republic, the northern half of its Vakaga Prefecture, which is adjacent to Chad and Sudan; a sliver of South Sudan at its border with Sudan; and the environs of Lake Chad spanning three other countries, namely part of Nigeria's (Borno State), Cameroon's Far North Region, and in the Diffa Department of Niger's Diffa Region. The number of speakers in Niger is estimated to be 150,000 people.

History 
How this Arabic language arose is unknown. In 1994, Braukämper proposed that it arose in Chad starting in 1635 by the fusion of a population of Arabic speakers with a population of Fulani nomads.  (The Fulani are a people, or group of peoples, who originate at or near the Atlantic coast but have expanded into most of the Sahel over centuries.)

During the colonial era, a form of pidgin Arabic known as Turku was used as a lingua franca. There are still Arabic pidgins in Chad today, but since they have not been described, it is not known if they descend from Turku.

Phonology

Notes:

 Old Arabic */ġ/ > /q/, /x/
 Old Arabic */ḥ/ > /h/
 Old Arabic */ʿ/ > /ʾ/ ([ʔ])
 Old Arabic */ṭ/ > /ɗ/ ([ɗˤ])

Some examples of minimal pairs for such emphatics are  "he galloped",  "he got angry";  "he tore",  "he dragged";  "uncle",  "mother". In addition, Nigerian Arabic has the feature of inserting an  after gutturals (ʔ,h,x,q).

Grammar 
A notable feature is the change of Standard Arabic Form V from tafaʕʕal(a) to alfaʕʕal; for example, the word taʔallam(a) becomes alʔallam.
The first person singular perfect tense of verbs is different from its formation in other Arabic dialects in that it does not have a final t.  Thus, the first person singular of the verb katab is katáb, with stress on the second syllable of the word, whereas the third-person singular is kátab, with stress on the first syllable.

Vocabulary 
The following is a sample vocabulary:

The two meanings of īd stem from formerly different words: *ʔīd "hand" < Classical yad vs. *ʕīd "festival" < Classical ʕīd.

In Classical Arabic, chicken (singular) is dajaja, and collectively dajaj.

See also
 Languages of Chad
 Languages of Cameroon
 Varieties of Arabic

Notes

References
  The 1954 printing contains the 1913 edition, including the original title page.
 
 
 
 
 
 
  174 pp.
  280 pp. N'Djamena dialect.

Further reading
 Howard, Charles G. 1921.  Shuwa Arabic Stories with an Introduction and Vocabulary Oxford: University Press, 1921, 114 pp.
 Kaye, Alan S. 1982. Dictionary of Nigerian Arabic. Malibu: Undena. Series: Bibliotheca Afroasiatica; 1. This volume is English-Arabic. 90 pp.
 Owens, Jonathan. 1993. A grammar of Nigerian Arabic. Wiesbaden: Otto Harrassowitz.
 Owens, Jonathan, ed. 1994. Arabs and Arabic in the Lake Chad Region. Rüdiger Köppe Verlag. Series: SUGIA (Sprache und Geschichte in Afrika); 14.
 Pommerol, Patrice Jullien de. 1999. J'apprends l'arabe tchadien. Karthala. 328 pp. N'Djamena dialect.
 Rumford, James, Rumford, Carol. 2020. Chadian Arabic, L'Arabe Tchadien. Manoa Press. 122 pp.
 Woidich, Manfred. 1988. [Review of Kaye 1987] . Journal of the American Oriental Society, October - December  1988, 108(4): 663-665

External links
 Chadian Arabic videos 

Chadian Arabs
Arabic languages
Languages of Chad
Languages of the Central African Republic
Languages of Sudan
Languages of Nigeria
Languages of Cameroon
Languages of Niger